Providence, Maryland may refer to; 

 Annapolis, Maryland, formerly Providence
 Providence, Cecil County, Maryland